Opasni put is a 1963 Croatian film directed by Mate Relja. It is based on a novel by Anton Ingolič.

References

External links
 

1963 films
Croatian war drama films
1960s Croatian-language films
Yugoslav war drama films
Jadran Film films
Yugoslav World War II films
Films based on Slovenian novels